Lloyd Montour (18 December 1925 – 22 January 2005) was a Canadian rower. He competed in the men's coxless four event at the 1952 Summer Olympics.

References

1925 births
2005 deaths
Canadian male rowers
Olympic rowers of Canada
Rowers at the 1952 Summer Olympics
Place of birth missing